Premaku Raincheck is a 2018 Indian Telugu-language romantic drama film directed by Akella Peri Srinivas. Featuring a cast and crew of newcomers, the film stars Abhilash Vadada, Priya Vadlamani, and Monica Tavanam.

Plot 
Wiki feels hesitant to say yes to the woman of his life that he met in his office, Ramya, because he is scared that it will spoil his life.

Cast 
Abhilash Vadada as Wiki
Priya Vadlamani as Ramya
Monica Tavanam as Tanya
Sasanka M. Velicherla as Gopi
Pavani Reddy as Riti 
Kalki Mitra as Anu
Suman as Mitra
Raghu Karumanchi as Momo
Kireeti Damaraju as Naresh

Production

Osmania University graduate, former investment banker, and company director Akella Peri Srinivas made his debut as a director at the age of 51. Newcomers Abhilash Vadada, Priya Vadlamani, and Monica Tavanam were selected since they could speak both Telugu and English. Srinivas had the idea for the film since 1996. One song ‘Podiche Poddulo’ was shot in Dehradun.

Reception
A critic from The Times of India gave the film a rating of three out of five stars and said that "Director Prabhakar Podakandla ensures the audience stick to their seats by creating a regular metro (city) ambiance, projecting lifestyle of regular working class. The movie slows down a bit on many occasions times. The traditional music and direction with the available resources and budget available, is an add on to the movie. When the movie is about to lose its pace, Ramya’s witty one-liners turn out to be the saving grace". Srividya Palaparthi of Cinema Express gave the film the same rating and opined that "If you’re willing to look past the inexperience of the film’s cast, you may find that the heart of this film is in the right place". A critic from 123Telugu gave the film a negative review and noted that "On the whole, Premaku Raincheck is a triangular love story which lacks the basic freshness".

References

External links

2018 films
2010s Telugu-language films
2018 romantic drama films
Indian romantic drama films